Tellers Organ Company was a manufacturer of pipe organs in Erie, Pennsylvania.  From 1906 to 1973, the company produced over 1,100 organs throughout the United States and Puerto Rico.

History 

The company was founded by two brothers, Henry and Ignatius Tellers, and William Sommerhof.  Prior to this, the two Tellers brothers worked at Milwaukee, Wisconsin based Schuelke Organ Company until 1892.  They moved to Erie and went to work for the Felgemaker Organ Company for the next 14 years, where they met Sommerhof.

In 1906, the three men established Tellers Organ Company.  In 1911, the company changed its name to Tellers-Sommerhof Organ Company.  Sommerhof would sell his interest in the company to A. E. Kent, another former Felgemaker employee, in 1918.  The company's name was then changed to Tellers-Kent Organ Company.  Felgemaker also ceased operations that year.  Tellers-Kent assumed all the open contracts and service agreement work from Felgemaker.  The company was known as Tellers-Kent for a number of years until the name changed back to Tellers Organ Company.

The company would eventually become a pioneer in the combination pipe/electronic organ fields and would come to produce the Conn-Tellers Electro-Pipe Combination Organ.  The company later became an authorized Rodgers Instruments dealer.

Lawrence Phelps purchased the Tellers factory in 1973 and established the Lawrence Phelps & Associates organ building firm.  Phelps would produce organs in Erie until the company went out of business in 1981.

Churches that have installed Tellers' organs 
 St. Alban's Episcopal Chapel, Salisbury, Maryland, installed 1969
 St. John's United Church of Christ, Jonestown, Pennsylvania, installed 1961
 Ninth Street Christian Church, Logansport, Indiana, installed 1952
 St. Boniface Church, Rochester, New York, installed 1961
 St. Paul Lutheran Church, Millington, Michigan, purchased 1965

References 

Pipe organ building companies
Musical instrument manufacturing companies of the United States
Companies based in Erie, Pennsylvania
American companies established in 1906
Manufacturing companies established in 1906
1906 establishments in Pennsylvania
American companies disestablished in 1973
Manufacturing companies disestablished in 1973
1973 disestablishments in Pennsylvania